MEAP may refer to:
 Canon MEAP (Multifunctional Embedded Application Platform), a software development kit for multifunction printers
 Mobile enterprise application platform, a development framework for mobile devices: iPhone, Android, Blackberry, Windows Phone, Web Mobile)
 Michigan Educational Assessment Program, a standardised school test
 MEAP Nisou, a Cypriot football club
 Meap, a fictional alien from Phineas and Ferb